Leslie Ann Hope is a Canadian actress and director, best known for her role as Teri Bauer on the Fox television series 24 and prosecutor Anita Gibbs on Suits.

Personal life
Hope was born in Halifax, Nova Scotia, to Ann and Frank Hope. She has one brother named Stephen. She graduated from St. Michael's University School at Victoria, British Columbia in 1982. Hope was married to writer and actor Jamie Angell from 1994 to 1996, with whom she has a son named MacKenzie, and to cinematographer, producer, and director Adam Kane from 2005 to 2015.

Career
Hope has appeared in many Canadian and American films and television series. Her first film role was in the Canadian film Ups and Downs, which was filmed in Victoria, in 1981. In 1982, she worked as a crew member for, and had a bit part in, Love Streams.

On television, in 1985, Hope portrayed Cammie Springer in Berrenger's. In 1987, she played the role of Madeleine Henry in the TV miniseries War and Remembrance. In 1993, she starred in Paris, France, directed by Gerard Ciccoritti. She later played the role of Teri Bauer in the first season of 24 (2001–02).

Hope starred in George A. Romero's film Bruiser. On television, she appeared in Star Trek: Deep Space Nine as Kira Nerys' mother Kira Meru and in the Gemini Award-winning series Human Cargo.

In 200304, Hope portrayed agent Lisa Cohen on Line of Fire. In 200506, she appeared as Attorney General of the United States Melanie Blackston in four episodes of Commander in Chief and, in the fall of 2006, played Lily Rader in the CW drama series, Runaway. In 2009, she played a detective on Seven Deadly Sins, a miniseries on Lifetime.

In 2014, Hope played attorney Joan Luss, a surviving passenger of Regis Airlines Flight 753, on FX's The Strain. She also has recurring roles in the crime series NCIS as Secretary of the Navy Sarah Porter and in the legal drama Suits as prosecutor Anita Gibbs. She was also cast in the television crime drama The Mentalist as Kristina Frye, portraying the role of a psychic medium.

Filmography

Film

Television

As an actor

As a director

References

External links

 
 

Living people
Actresses from Halifax, Nova Scotia
Canadian emigrants to the United States
Canadian film actresses
Canadian television actresses
20th-century Canadian actresses
21st-century Canadian actresses
Year of birth missing (living people)